Christine Tucci is an American actress.

Life and career
Tucci, an Italian American, was born in Katonah, New York, the daughter of Joan (née Tropiano), a retired secretary and writer, and Stanley Tucci, Sr., a retired high school art teacher, both of whom have roots in the town of Marzi in Calabria. 

Tucci had a semi-regular role on the television series MDs (2002) and played Amanda Cory on the soap opera Another World from 1993 to 1995. She was a regular cast member on C-16, in the role of Special Agent Anne Rooney, from 1997 to 1998.<ref>Terrace, Vincent. Encyclopedia of Television Shows, 1925 through 2007 (Jefferson, North Carolina: McFarland & Co., 2008), p.331.</ref> She played Sergeant Welles in the movie K-911, released direct-to-video in 1999; in 2000, she made an appearance as Dr. Kiera Behrle on CSI: Crime Scene Investigation. She appeared in the 2003 TV movie Straight From the Heart as Carla Dimaggio.

Tucci is married to Vincent Angell. They have one son, who is autistic. Tucci and Angell played parents of an autistic boy on an episode of Without a Trace''.

Filmography

References

External links
 

American film actresses
American soap opera actresses
American people of Italian descent
Living people
People from Katonah, New York
21st-century American women
Year of birth missing (living people)